Wendy Hong Wen (born in 1975) is a Hong Kong politician who is one of the elected Legislative Council members for the Election Committee constituency. In addition to public office, she is serving as head of research at the New World Development Company Limited.

In 2021, a law was enacted where lawmakers had to be "patriots" and loyal to the government. Later in January 2022, after gaining a seat in the "patriots"-only election, Hong inferred that previous anti-establishment legislative council members were responsible for dysfunction in Hong Kong, claiming "We couldn't focus on development for a long time because our society and the chamber were highly divided, and the Legislative Council was not able to function smoothly."

On 5 January 2022, Carrie Lam announced new warnings and restrictions against social gathering due to potential COVID-19 outbreaks. One day later, it was discovered that Hong attended a birthday party hosted by Witman Hung Wai-man, with 222 guests. At least one guest tested positive with COVID-19, causing all guests to be quarantined.

In September 2022, Hong tested positive for COVID-19.

Electoral history

References 

Living people
1975 births
HK LegCo Members 2022–2025
Members of the Election Committee of Hong Kong, 2021–2026
Hong Kong pro-Beijing politicians